Griffen House, at 205 Gallatin St. in Thompson Falls, Montana, was built in 1912.  It was listed on the National Register of Historic Places in 1986.  It has also been known as Kendall House.

It has a gable roof.

It was home for Claude W. Criffen, who came in 1911 to lead the U.S. Forest Service operations in Thompson Falls.  He served as Supervisor
of the Cabinet National Forest until 1917.  It was later home of Orin Kendall (d.1982), who served as County Superintendent of Schools from 1946 to 1968, then served in the state legislature.  He also served as mayor of Thompson Falls and on the town council.

References

Houses on the National Register of Historic Places in Montana
Houses completed in 1912
National Register of Historic Places in Sanders County, Montana
1912 establishments in Montana
Bungalow architecture in Montana
Thompson Falls, Montana